Micromystix, is a monotypic snout moth genus described by Joseph de Joannis in 1929. Its only species, Micromystix exigua, described by the same author in the same year, is known from Vietnam (including Tonkin, the type location).

References

Moths described in 1929
Pyralinae
Monotypic moth genera
Moths of Asia
Pyralidae genera